The Devil's Lantern (Italian: La lanterna del diavolo) is a 1931 Italian drama film directed by Carlo Campogalliani and starring Nella Maria Bonora, Donatella Neri, and Carlo Gualandri.

It was made at the Cines Studios in Rome.

Cast
 Nella Maria Bonora 
 Donatella Neri 
 Carlo Gualandri as Capobanda  
 Letizia Quaranta 
 Carlo Tamberlani 
 Raimondo Van Riel 
 Alfredo Martinelli 
 Guido Celano 
 La Baiocchi 
 Il Piccolo Lamberto

References

Bibliography
 Mancini, Elaine. Struggles of the Italian film industry during fascism, 1930-1935. UMI Research Press, 1985.

External links

1931 films
1931 drama films
Italian drama films
1930s Italian-language films
Films directed by Carlo Campogalliani
Cines Studios films
Italian black-and-white films
1930s Italian films